Jordan is a neighborhood in the Near North community in Minneapolis. Its boundaries are Lowry Avenue North to the north, Emerson Avenue North to the east, and West Broadway to the south and west.

References

External links
 Minneapolis Neighborhood Profile - Jordan
 Jordan Area Community Council
 MN Compass Neighborhood Facts
 

Neighborhoods in Minneapolis